Nordbahn may refer to:
 Berlin Northern Railway (Berliner Nordbahn), a railway line in Germany
 Friedrich-Wilhelms-Nordbahn, another railway line in Germany
 Nordbahn Eisenbahngesellschaft, a railway company based in Hamburg, Germany
 North railway (Austria) (Nordbahn), a railway line in Austria and the Czech Republic
 Pfälzische Nordbahn, a railway line in Rhineland-Palatinate, Germany
 Swiss Northern Railway, (Schweizerische Nordbahn, SNB). a one time Swiss railway

See also 
 Northern Railway (disambiguation)